Fikirtepe is a station on the Istanbul Metrobus Bus rapid transit line. It is located on the Istanbul Inner Beltway, with entrances on Yıldırım Street and Özbey Avenue. The station is serviced by four of the seven Metrobus routes.

Fikirtepe station was opened on 3 March 2009 as part of the eastward expansion of the line across the Bosporus.

References

External links
Fikirtepe station
Fikirtepe in Google Street View

Istanbul Metrobus stations
2009 establishments in Turkey
Transport in Kadıköy